This is the list of episodes for the Kids' WB series Batman Beyond.

Series overview

Season 1 (1999)

Season 2 (1999–2000)

Season 3 (2000–2001)

Film

Batman Beyond: Return of the Joker

Shorts

Crossovers
Batman Beyond has had multiple crossovers with other shows in the DC animated universe.

The Zeta Project

Static Shock

Justice League Unlimited

References

External links

 
 The Animated Batman
 Batman Animated at BYTB: Batman Yesterday, Today and Beyond
 Batman Beyond at Rotten Tomatoes

Episodes
Lists of American children's animated television series episodes
Lists of DC Animated Universe episodes
Batman television series episodes